Kent School may refer to:

 Kent School, Hostert, a former British military boarding school in Germany
 Kent School, USA, a school in Kent county, Connecticut, USA